The Anicuns Microregion is a geographical division in the state of Goiás, Brazil. It is made up of 13 municipalities located around Anicuns, a municipality west of Goiânia.

Municipalities 
The microregion consists of the following municipalities:

See also 
Microregions of Goiás
List of municipalities in Goiás

References

Microregions of Goiás